Babelomurex natalabies is a species of sea snail, a marine gastropod mollusc in the family Muricidae, the murex snails or rock snails.

Description

Distribution
The holotype of this marine species was found off New Caledonia.

References

 Oliverio, M., 2008. Coralliophilinae (Neogastropoda: Muricidae) from the southwest Pacific. Mémoires du Muséum national d'Histoire naturelle 196: 481–585

natalabies
Gastropods described in 2008